Ade Sutrisna (9 March 1974 – 15 November 2016) was an Indonesian badminton player.

Sutrisna won four medals at the Asian Championships and Asian Cup combined, which includes the Gold medal from 1996 Asian Championships with Chandra Wijaya. During most of the part of his career, he partnered with Wijaya and won titles in United States, Canada, Malaysia, Poland, India and Sweden; four of them being of Grand Prix level. He died of kidney failure at the age of 42 in 2016.

Achievements

Asian Championships 

Men's doubles

Asian Cup 

Men's doubles

World Junior Championships 

The Bimantara World Junior Championships was an international invitation badminton tournament for junior players. It was held in Jakarta, Indonesia from 1987 to 1991.

Boys' doubles

IBF World Grand Prix 
The World Badminton Grand Prix sanctioned by International Badminton Federation (IBF) from 1983 to 2006.

Men's doubles

IBF International 

Men's doubles

References 

Indonesian male badminton players
1974 births
2016 deaths